Ray High School is a high school in Kearny, Arizona. It is the only high school under the jurisdiction of the Ray Unified School District, which also operates a primary and elementary school. The high school was originally located in Ray, Arizona but was moved to Kearny, Arizona.

References

External links

Public high schools in Arizona
Schools in Pinal County, Arizona